Bernardo Hernández Villaseñor (born 20 August 1942) is a Mexican former professional footballer who competed in the 1968 Summer Olympics.

Career
Hernández played club football for Atlante from 1961 to 1973, and he led the league in goal-scoring during the 1967–68 season.

Hernández made 12 appearances for the senior Mexico national team.

References

1942 births
Living people
Mexico international footballers
Association football forwards
Olympic footballers of Mexico
Footballers at the 1968 Summer Olympics
Atlante F.C. footballers
Footballers from Mexico City
Mexican footballers